Caleb Angas (1782 – 6 February 1860) was an agriculturist from Newcastle upon Tyne, England. He was a brother for George Fife Angas.  Angas lived at Brancepeth in County Durham until he was 32, when he moved to John Grimston's Neswick farm in the East Riding of Yorkshire. He was considered to be the best authority on farming in the Riding, and was not only a clever writer and a good mathematician, but he possessed considerable mechanical information. His letters to the Sun newspaper attracted much attention, and were of great service to the cause of free trade. Richard Cobden frequently referred to them in the course of his crusade against protection. He died at Driffield on 6 February 1860.

References

1782 births
1860 deaths
English agronomists
19th-century English farmers
English activists
People from County Durham (district)